This is a list of mayors of Villars-sur-Glâne, Canton of Fribourg, Switzerland. The executive of Villars-sur-Glâne is the municipal council (Conseil communal). It is presided by the mayor (Syndic de Villars-sur-Glâne).

References 

Villars-sur-Glane
 
Lists of mayors (complete 1900-2013)